Stadion Hristo Botev is a multi-purpose stadium, located in Blagoevgrad, Bulgaria.  It is used for football matches and is home ground to FC Pirin Blagoevgrad. The stadium holds 11,000 spectators but is being expanded to 18,000. As of 2009, the stadium is being renovated and will be equipped with electric lightning. The renovation cost € 1,5 million and it was completed in 2010.

Gallery 

Football venues in Bulgaria
Sport in Blagoevgrad
Multi-purpose stadiums in Bulgaria
Buildings and structures in Blagoevgrad Province
1934 establishments in Bulgaria
Sports venues completed in 1934
OFC Pirin Blagoevgrad